In physics, the algebra of physical space (APS) is the use of the Clifford or geometric algebra Cl3,0(R) of the three-dimensional Euclidean space as a model for (3+1)-dimensional spacetime, representing a point in spacetime via a paravector (3-dimensional vector plus a 1-dimensional scalar).

The Clifford algebra Cl3,0(R) has a faithful representation, generated by Pauli matrices, on the spin representation C2; further, Cl3,0(R) is isomorphic to the even subalgebra Cl(R) of the Clifford algebra Cl3,1(R).

APS can be used to construct a compact, unified and geometrical formalism for both classical and quantum mechanics.

APS should not be confused with spacetime algebra (STA), which concerns the Clifford algebra Cl1,3(R) of the four-dimensional Minkowski spacetime.

Special relativity

Spacetime position paravector

In APS, the spacetime position is represented as the paravector

where the time is given by the scalar part , and e1, e2, e3 are the standard basis for position space. Throughout, units such that  are used, called natural units. In the Pauli matrix representation, the unit basis vectors are replaced by the Pauli matrices and the scalar part by the identity matrix. This means that the Pauli matrix representation of the space-time position is

Lorentz transformations and rotors

The restricted Lorentz transformations that preserve the direction of time and include rotations and boosts can be performed by an exponentiation of the spacetime rotation biparavector W 

In the matrix representation, the Lorentz rotor is seen to form an instance of the SL(2,C) group (special linear group of degree 2 over the complex numbers), which is the double cover of the Lorentz group.  The unimodularity of the Lorentz rotor is translated in the following condition in terms of the product of the Lorentz rotor with its Clifford conjugation

This Lorentz rotor can be always decomposed in two factors, one Hermitian , and the other unitary , such that

The unitary element R is called a rotor because this encodes rotations, and the Hermitian element B encodes boosts.

Four-velocity paravector

The four-velocity, also called proper velocity, is defined as the derivative of the spacetime position paravector with respect to proper time τ:

This expression can be brought to a more compact form by defining the ordinary velocity as 

and recalling the definition of the gamma factor:

so that the proper velocity is more compactly:

The proper velocity is a positive unimodular paravector, which implies the following condition in terms of the Clifford conjugation

The proper velocity transforms under the action of the Lorentz rotor L as

Four-momentum paravector

The four-momentum in APS can be obtained by multiplying the proper velocity with the mass as

with the mass shell condition translated into

Classical electrodynamics

The electromagnetic field, potential, and current

The electromagnetic field is represented as a bi-paravector F: 

with the Hermitian part representing the electric field E and the anti-Hermitian part representing the magnetic field B. In the standard Pauli matrix representation, the electromagnetic field is:

The source of the field F is the electromagnetic four-current:

where the scalar part equals the electric charge density ρ, and the vector part the electric current density j. Introducing the electromagnetic potential paravector defined as:

in which the scalar part equals the electric potential ϕ, and the vector part the magnetic potential A. The electromagnetic field is then also:

The field can be split into electric

and magnetic 

components.
Where

and F is invariant under a gauge transformation of the form

where  is a scalar field.

The electromagnetic field is covariant under Lorentz transformations according to the law

Maxwell's equations and the Lorentz force

The Maxwell equations can be expressed in a single equation:

where the overbar represents the Clifford conjugation.

The Lorentz force equation takes the form

Electromagnetic Lagrangian

The electromagnetic Lagrangian is

which is a real scalar invariant.

Relativistic quantum mechanics

The Dirac equation, for an electrically charged particle of mass m and charge e, takes the form:

where e3 is an arbitrary unitary vector, and A is the electromagnetic paravector potential as above. The electromagnetic interaction has been included via minimal coupling in terms of the potential A.

Classical spinor

The differential equation of the Lorentz rotor that is consistent with the Lorentz force is

such that the proper velocity is calculated as the Lorentz transformation of the proper velocity at rest

which can be integrated to find the space-time trajectory  with the additional use of

See also

 Paravector
 Multivector
 wikibooks:Physics in the Language of Geometric Algebra. An Approach with the Algebra of Physical Space
 Dirac equation in the algebra of physical space
Algebra

References

Textbooks

Articles

Mathematical physics
Geometric algebra
Clifford algebras
Special relativity
Electromagnetism